Austin Luke (born October 27, 1994) is an American basketball player who last played for Donar in the BNXT League. He primarily plays as point guard.

College career
Luke played four years of college basketball for Belmont. He was named to the All-OVC First Team twice, in 2017 and 2018. As a senior, Luke averaged 9.2 points, 7.5 assists, and 2.9 rebounds per game.

Professional career
In July 2018, Luke started his professional career in Latvia, signing with VEF Rīga. He was released after 6 games. He later signed with VfL Kirchheim Knights in the German ProA.

In the 2019–20 season, Luke played for Club Melilla Baloncesto in the Spanish LEB Oro.

On August 17, 2020, Luke signed with Basketball Community Gelderland of the Dutch Basketball League (DBL). The team later changed its name to Yoast United. Luke averaged 16.2 points and a league-high 9.6 assists over the regular season.

On April 30, 2021, Luke sent Yoast United to the final of the 2021 DBL Cup after an impressive performance against Landstede Hammers. In the semi-final, he recorded 52 points, 8 rebounds and 8 assists, including 10 three-point field goals. As a result, the seventh-ranked team Yoast reached the cup final in its debut season.

On June 4, 2021, Luke signed a one-year contract with Donar in the DBL. On May 20, 2022, he won the Dutch Basketball Cup with Donar, leading the team with team-highs of 15 points and 8 assists in the final. On June 8, Luke scored a team-high 31 points in a decisive 101–100 semifinal win over Heroes Den Bosch to bring Donar to its first ever BNXT finals.

References

External links
Belmont Bruins bio

1994 births
Living people
American expatriate basketball people in Germany
American expatriate basketball people in Latvia
American expatriate basketball people in the Netherlands
American expatriate basketball people in Spain
American men's basketball players
Basketball players from Texas
Belmont Bruins men's basketball players
BK VEF Rīga players
Club Melilla Baloncesto players
Donar (basketball club) players
Dutch Basketball League players
People from Rowlett, Texas
Point guards
Sportspeople from the Dallas–Fort Worth metroplex
VfL Kirchheim Knights players
Yoast United players
Helios Suns players